Bydlin Castle is a fourteenth-century castle ruins, located in the Kraków-Częstochowa Upland. The fortress was built as part of the Trail of the Eagles' Nests defence system, located in the village of Bydlin, Lesser Poland Voivodeship in Poland.

References

Castles in Lesser Poland Voivodeship